Hans Ring (19 June 1928 – 9 April 2015) was a Swedish middle-distance runner. He competed in the men's 800 metres at the 1952 Summer Olympics.

References

1928 births
2015 deaths
Athletes (track and field) at the 1952 Summer Olympics
Swedish male middle-distance runners
Olympic athletes of Sweden
Place of birth missing